Linden is a village in Iowa County, Wisconsin, United States. The population was 549 at the 2010 census. The village is located within the Town of Linden.

Geography
Linden is located at  (42.917433, -90.273384).

Demographics

2010 census
As of the census of 2010, there were 549 people, 214 households, and 135 families living in the village. The racial makeup of the village was 97.6% White, 0.5% African American, 0.2% Native American, 0.7% from other races, and 0.9% from two or more races. Hispanic or Latino of any race were 1.1% of the population.

There were 214 households, of which 37.9% had children under the age of 18 living with them, 44.4% were married couples living together, 9.8% had a female householder with no husband present, 8.9% had a male householder with no wife present, and 36.9% were non-families. 28.5% of all households were made up of individuals, and 12.2% had someone living alone who was 65 years of age or older. The average household size was 2.57 and the average family size was 3.19.

The median age in the village was 36.4 years. 29% of residents were under the age of 18; 9.5% were between the ages of 18 and 24; 26.9% were from 25 to 44; 24.2% were from 45 to 64; and 10.6% were 65 years of age or older. The gender makeup of the village was 48.8% male and 51.2% female.

2000 census
As of the census of 2000, there were 615 people, 223 households, and 158 families living in the village. The population density was 796.2 people per square mile (308.4/km2). There were 234 housing units at an average density of 302.9 per square mile (117.3/km2). The racial makeup of the village was 99.02% White, 0.16% Black or African American, 0.49% Native American, and 0.33% from two or more races. 0.00% of the population were Hispanic or Latino of any race.

There were 223 households, out of which 42.6% had children under the age of 18 living with them, 55.6% were married couples living together, 10.3% had a female householder with no husband present, and 29.1% were non-families. 23.8% of all households were made up of individuals, and 9.9% had someone living alone who was 65 years of age or older. The average household size was 2.76 and the average family size was 3.32.

In the village, the population was spread out, with 31.5% under the age of 18, 9.3% from 18 to 24, 34.5% from 25 to 44, 15.3% from 45 to 64, and 9.4% who were 65 years of age or older. The median age was 30 years. For every 100 females, there were 96.5 males. For every 100 females age 18 and over, there were 100.5 males.

The median income for a household in the village was $35,833, and the median income for a family was $48,750. Males had a median income of $29,250 versus $20,938 for females. The per capita income for the village was $16,331. About 6.8% of families and 8.8% of the population were below the poverty line, including 11.0% of those under age 18 and 13.6% of those age 65 or over.

Notable people
 Edmund Baker, businessman and politician
 Kearton Coates, Wisconsin State Representative
 Oscar Hallam, Minnesota Supreme Court justice
 John Hammill, Governor of Iowa

See also
 List of villages in Wisconsin

References

External links

 Linden High School, 1917 pamphlet

Villages in Iowa County, Wisconsin
Villages in Wisconsin